Boldizsár is both a Hungarian masculine given name and surname. It is a cognate of the Biblical name Balthazar. Individuals bearing the name Boldizsár include:

Given name
Boldizsár Báthory (1560–1594), Transylvanian politician
Boldizsár Bodor (born 1982), Hungarian footballer
Boldizsár Csiky (born 1937), Romanian composer
Boldizsár Horvát (1822–1898), Hungarian politician, poet, and novelist
Boldizsár Kiss (born 1985), Hungarian swimmer 

Surname
Gáspár Boldizsár, Hungarian sprint canoer 
Iván Boldizsár (1912–1988), Hungarian journalist, writer, and editor

References

Masculine given names
Hungarian masculine given names
Hungarian-language surnames